Cornelisz is a given name. Notable people with the name include:

Adriaen Cornelisz van Linschoten (1590–1677), Dutch Golden Age painter
Charles Cornelisz. de Hooch (1600–1638), Dutch Golden Age landscape painter
Claes Cornelisz. Moeyaert, also known as Claes Corneliszoon Moeyaert (1592–1655), authoritative Catholic Dutch painter
Cornelis Cornelisz, also known as Cornelis van Haarlem, (1562–1638), Dutch Golden Age painter and draughtsman
Cornelis Cornelisz Kunst (1493–1544), Dutch Renaissance painter
Cornelisz Vroom, also known as Cornelis Vroom, (1591–1661), Dutch Golden Age landscape painter
Hendrick Cornelisz. van Vliet (1611–1675), Dutch Golden Age painter remembered mostly for his church interiors
Hendrick Cornelisz Vroom (1562–1640),) was a Dutch Golden Age painter credited with being the founder of Dutch marine art or seascape painting
Jacob Cornelisz. van Neck (1564–1638), Dutch naval officer and explorer who led the second Dutch expedition to Indonesia from 1598 to 1599
Jacob Cornelisz van Oostsanen (1470–1533), Northern Netherlandish designer of woodcuts and painter
Jan Cornelisz Vermeyen, or Jan Mayo, or Barbalonga (1500–1559), Dutch Northern Renaissance painter
Jeronimus Cornelisz (1598–1629), Frisian apothecary and Dutch East India Company (VOC) merchant
Johannes Cornelisz Verspronck (1600–1662), gifted Dutch Golden Age portraitist
Joost Cornelisz Droochsloot or Droogsloot (1586–1666), Dutch Golden Age painter
Lucas Cornelisz de Kock or Kunst (1495–1552), Dutch Renaissance painter active in the Tudor court
Pieter Cornelisz Hooft, also known as Pieter Corneliszoon Hooft, (1581–1647), Dutch historian, poet and playwright from the Dutch Golden Age
Pieter Cornelisz Kunst (1484–1560), Dutch Renaissance painter
Pieter Cornelisz Plockhoy van Zierikzee, also known as Pieter Corneliszoon Plockhoy, (1625–1670), Dutch Mennonite and Collegiant utopist
Pieter Cornelisz van Rijck (1567–1637), Dutch Golden Age painter
Pieter Cornelisz van Slingelandt (1640–1691), Dutch Golden Age portrait painter
Pieter Cornelisz van Soest (1600–1620), Dutch marine artist, especially prolific in battle-pieces
Pieter Cornelisz Verbeeck (1610–1654), Dutch Golden Age painter
Willem Cornelisz. van Muyden (1573–1634), early 17th century mariner
Willem Cornelisz Duyster (1599–1635), Dutch Golden Age painter from Amsterdam

See also
Cornelia (disambiguation)
Cornelianus
Cornelis (disambiguation)
Cornelisse
Cornelissen
Corneliszoon
Cornelius (disambiguation)